Alessandro Marzuoli (born 26 February 1984 in Italy) is an Italian retired footballer.

Career

While playing for AC Oulu in 2015, Marzuoli scored a goal in injury time to make it 3-3 against PS Kemi Kings in the Finnish Super Cup, helping them advance to the quarter-finals.

References

Italian footballers
Association football goalkeepers
Living people
1984 births
Vaasan Palloseura players
AC Oulu players
IF Gnistan players